Gautrekr was a legendary Geatish king who appears in several sources, such as Gautreks saga, Hrólfs saga Gautrekssonar, Bósa saga ok Herrauðs, Ynglinga saga, Nafnaþulur (part of the Prose Edda) and Af Upplendinga konungum.

He appears in different temporal settings, and he could represent different kings named Gautrekr, as the name simply means "Geatish ruler". In the various settings, he also has different offspring. However, all settings present him as the son of a Gaut or Gauti, and in one of the later settings, his father Gaut gave his name to Götaland (Geatland).

In Nafnaþulur, he is mentioned as one of the sea-kings, after his father Gauti.

Early setting
In the early setting, Gautrekr is the contemporary of legendary characters such as Starkad and the Swedish kings Erik and Alrik.

Gautreks saga tells that Gautrekr was born out of the meeting between Gauti, the king of Västergötland, and Snotra who was the most intelligent of a family of backwoods skinflints. Her family committed suicide for having lost too much food supporting Gauti as their guest. Snotra took the child Gautrek to Gauti's court and King Gauti, years later on his deathbed, made Gautrek his heir.

Gautrekr married Álfhildr, the daughter of king Harald of Wendland. When she died, Gautrekr went somewhat out of his mind, ignored all matters of state, and spent all his time on Álfhildr's burial mound, flying his hawk. 

Through trickery and the advice of Neri, one of Gautrekr's earls, a man named Ref gained the 
hand of Gautrek's daughter Helga. He also gained the earldom that Neri held from King Gautrekr.

If Gautreks saga tells that Gautrekr had the daughter Helga, Hrólfs saga Gautrekssonar adds two sons, Ketill and Hrólfr Gautreksson. They both succeeded Gautrekr and Hrólfr spent many years pillaging in Brittany and Great Britain until he finally kidnapped the Scandinavian princess and made her his wife.

Gautrekr the Mild
In the late setting, Gautrekr the Mild is the father of Algautr, the last Geatish king, in Scandinavian legends. 

Both Af Upplendinga konungum and Ynglinga saga  describe him as the son of Gaut, after whom Götaland (Geatland) took its name. Af Upplendinga konungum tells that Gautrekr was married to Alof, the daughter of Olaf the Clear-Sighted, the king of Närke. Both sources tell that Gautrekr had a son named Algautr whose daughter Gauthildr married the pre-Swedish king Ingjald Ill-ruler.

The Ynglinga saga then continues by telling how the pre-Swedish king invited Algautr and several other petty kings to a banquet at Uppsala only to be burnt to death inside the hall where they had the banquet. Ingjald then proceeded to conquer the kingdoms of the dead kings.

Gautrekr the Generous
In Bósa saga ok Herrauðs, Gautrekr the Generous is shortly mentioned as the son of Gauti, the son of Odin. It adds that his brother Ring was the king of Östergötland and the father of Herrauðr. This Herrauðr is the same as the Geatish earl who gave his daughter Þóra Town-Hart to Ragnar Lodbrok, when he had saved her from the Lindworm in a number of other sagas.

Kings of the Geats